Mark Wall (born 13 January 1970) is an Irish Labour Party politician who has served as a Senator for the Industrial and Commercial Panel since April 2020.

Biography
Wall attended Churchtown N.S and Scoil Eoin in Athy and later received a Diploma in Marketing and Business Studies from I.T Carlow.

His father, Jack Wall was a Senator from 1993 to 1997 and TD from 1997 to 2016.

Political career 
He was first elected to Kildare County Council at the 2009 Kildare County Council election and additionally to Athy Town Council at the same time. Wall served as Deputy Mayor of Athy in 2012, Mayor of Athy in 2012-2013, Mayor of Kildare in 2013-2014 and was elected Cathaoirleach of Athy Municipal District in 2015. Wall has served as a board member of Scoil Lorcain Castledermot, Kildare Centre for the Unemployed, Churchtown Castlemitchell Community Development Association, Athy Heritage Company and The Willow Project.

He was an unsuccessful candidate for Kildare South at the 2016 and 2020 general elections, but was elected to the Seanad in 2020. Mark Leigh was co-opted to Wall's seat on Kildare County Council following his election to the Seanad.

During his time in the Seanad, Wall has spoken about the issue of gambling addiction and repeatedly raised the issue. In 2021, Wall introduced a bill to ban gambling advertisements, stating that adequate supports should be "in place to help those suffering from (gambling) addiction". A survey conducted by Wall in 2021 found that three in every four Irish people knew someone with a gambling addiction, with Wall stating this was "hugely concerning".

References

External links
Mark Wall's page on the Labour Party website

Living people
Local councillors in County Kildare
Labour Party (Ireland) senators
Members of the 26th Seanad
People from County Kildare
1970 births
Alumni of Institute of Technology, Carlow